Mike Southon may refer to:

 Mike Southon (writer), British entrepreneur and author
 Mike Southon (cinematographer), British cinematographer